The 1995 Australian Production Car Championship was a CAMS sanctioned national motor racing title for drivers of Group 3E Series Production Cars.

Calendar
The title was contested over a six round series with two races per round.

Championship points were awarded on a 20-15-12-10-8-6-4-3-2-1 basis to the top ten finishers in each race. 
A separate Class B award was open to drivers of Group 3E cars of up to 1.6 litre engine capacity with points awarded on a 9-6-4-3-2-1 basis to the top six Class B finishers in each race.

Results

References

Further reading
 Official Programme, Mallala Raceway, 9 July 1995

External links
 Australian Titles Retrieved from CAMS Manual of Motor Sport on 8 August 2008

Australian Production Car Championship
Production Car Championship